Boysen Reservoir is a reservoir formed by Boysen Dam, an earth-fill dam on the Wind River in the central part of the U.S. state of Wyoming.  It is near the town of Shoshoni in Fremont County.  The dam was constructed between 1947 and 1952 at the mouth of Wind River Canyon, just upstream from a previous dam that had been built by Asmus Boysen in 1908 on land he had leased from the Shoshone and Arapaho tribes.  The dam and much of the reservoir are physically located on the Wind River Indian Reservation.

Boysen Dam Railroad Tunnel

As a result of construction of the dam a major railroad track that connected Billings, Montana with Casper, Wyoming was flooded. A new  track was laid, starting near the new dam where a 1 mile tunnel carried the tracks under the dam and around the edges of the reservoir.

Boysen State Park

Surrounding the reservoir is Boysen State Park, run by the state of Wyoming.  It includes 11 campgrounds spread around the reservoir and nearby area.  The reservoir is a popular sporting area with numerous species of fish including walleye, perch, crappie, channel catfish, as well as rainbow and brown trout and several other species.  Boysen Marina sits near the shore on the northeast side of the reservoir and has a bait shop and cafe and offers boat and jet ski rentals.

See also
List of largest reservoirs of Wyoming

References

External links
 State Park Website
 Boysen Dam Information

Reservoirs in Wyoming
Protected areas of Fremont County, Wyoming
State parks of Wyoming
Bodies of water of Fremont County, Wyoming
IUCN Category III
Wind River Indian Reservation